Grigore, the equivalent of Gregory, is a Romanian-language first name. It may refer to:

Grigore Alexandrescu (1810–1885), Romanian poet and translator
Grigore Antipa (1866–1944), Romanian Darwinist biologist, ichthyologist, ecologist, oceanologist
Grigore Băjenaru (1907–1986), Romanian writer
Grigore Bălan (1896–1944), Romanian Brigadier General during World War II
Grigore Vasiliu Birlic (1905–1970), Romanian actor
Grigore Brișcu (1984–1965), Romanian engineer and inventor
Grigore Cobălcescu (1831–1892), founder of Romanian geology and paleontology
Grigore Constantinescu (1875–1932), priest and journalist from Romania
Grigore Cugler (1903–1972), Romanian avant-garde short story writer, poet, and humorist
Grigore Eremei (b. 1935), Moldovan politician, final First secretary of the Communist Party of Moldavia
Grigore Gafencu (1892–1957), Romanian politician, diplomat and journalist
Grigore Alexandru Ghica (1803 or 1807–1857), Prince of Moldavia
Grigore Leșe (b. 1954), Romanian musician
Grigore Moisil (1906–1973), Romanian mathematician and computer pioneer
Grigore Niculescu-Buzești (1908–1949), Romanian politician
Grigore T. Popa (1892–1948), Romanian physician and public intellectual
Grigore Răceanu (1906–1996), Romanian communist politician
Grigore Simionescu (1857–1932), Romanian general
Grigore Tocilescu (1850–1909), Romanian historian, archaeologist, epigrapher and folklorist
Grigore Turcuman (1890–1942), Bessarabian Romanian politician
Grigore Ureche (1590–1647), Moldavian chronicler
Grigore Vieru (1935–2009), Moldovan poet and writer

Romanian masculine given names